Weekend at Bernie's is a 1989 American black comedy film directed by Ted Kotcheff and written by Robert Klane. The film stars Andrew McCarthy and Jonathan Silverman as young insurance corporation employees who discover that their boss, Bernie, is dead, after arriving at his house.

While attempting to convince people that Bernie is still alive until they can leave to prevent them from being falsely suspected for causing his death, they discover that Bernie had ordered their own assassinations to cover up his embezzlement. Weekend at Bernie’s grossed $30 million on a $15 million budget. The film's success inspired a sequel, Weekend at Bernie's II (1993).

Plot
Larry Wilson and Richard Parker are two low-level financial employees at an insurance corporation in New York City. While going over actuarial reports, Richard discovers a series of payments made for the same death. He and Larry take their findings to the CEO, the wealthy and hedonistic Bernie Lomax, who commends them for discovering the insurance fraud and invites them to his beach house in The Hamptons for the Labor Day weekend. Unbeknownst to the pair, Bernie is behind the fraud. Nervously meeting with his mob partner Vito, Bernie asks to have the two killed. However, after Bernie leaves, Vito orders that Bernie himself be killed for sleeping with Vito's girlfriend, Tina.

Bernie arrives at the island before the pair and plans the murders with Paulie, the hitman, on the phone, unaware the conversation is being recorded on his answering machine. Paulie arrives and kills Bernie with a lethal heroin injection, then stages it as self-inflicted. Larry and Richard subsequently find Bernie's body. Before they can call the authorities, guests arrive for a party that Bernie usually hosts every weekend. To the pair's amazement, the guests are too busy partying to notice he's dead, with his dopey grin from the injection and his sunglasses concealing his lifeless state. Fearing implication in Bernie's death, and wanting to enjoy the luxury of the house for the weekend, Larry proposes he and Richard maintain the illusion that Bernie is still alive, which Richard finds absurd. Only the arrival of Richard's office crush Gwen Saunders, a summer intern for the company, convinces him to go along with Larry's plan. Later that night, a drunken Tina arrives at the house and demands the pair direct her to Bernie. However, she also fails to realize the situation and has sex with his corpse. One of Vito's mobsters witnesses this and, mistakenly thinking Bernie's assassination failed, notifies Vito, who sends Paulie back. 

The next morning, Richard is appalled to discover Larry furthering the illusion by manipulating Bernie's limbs. He attempts to call the cops, but instead activates the phone message detailing Bernie's plot against them. Unaware of how Bernie died, they mistakenly believe they are still the targets of a mob hit and, as Bernie had said not to kill them while he was in the area, decide to use Bernie's corpse as a shield. All of the pair's attempts to leave the island are thwarted, as they repeatedly misplace and recover Bernie's body, and they are finally forced to return to Bernie's home. Meanwhile, while they are not looking, Paulie makes numerous other assassination attempts, and grows unhinged at his repeated "failures".

Gwen, who has been trying to talk to Bernie, sees Larry and Richard with him and confronts them, forcing them to reveal his death. Paulie then appears and opens fire on Bernie, before turning his attention to Larry, Richard, and Gwen. Chasing after the trio, Paulie corners Larry, who manages to subdue him. 

The police eventually arrive and arrest Paulie, taking him away in a straitjacket as he continues to insist Bernie is still alive. Gwen invites Richard to stay with her family for the week, while Larry decides to go home to give them space. Bernie is loaded into an ambulance; however, his gurney rolls away and topples off the boardwalk, dumping him onto the beach right behind the trio, who run away in disgust. Afterwards, a young boy, who earlier tried to bury Bernie in the sand, comes along and successfully does so.

Cast
 Andrew McCarthy as Larry Wilson
 Jonathan Silverman as Richard Parker
 Terry Kiser as Bernie Lomax
 Catherine Mary Stewart as Gwen Saunders
 Don Calfa as Paulie
 Catherine Parks as Tina
 Eloise Broady as Tawny
 Greg Salata as Marty
 Louis Giambalvo as Vito
 Ted Kotcheff as Mr. Parker
 Jason Woliner as Bratty Kid

Production 
Jon Cryer was originally cast in the film, but was replaced by McCarthy.  Shooting took place in New York City in August 1988. The Hamptons scenes were filmed in the Bald Head Island, North Carolina, Bernie's house was filmed at Fort Fisher, North Carolina, and the ferry scenes were filmed at Wrightsville Beach, North Carolina.

Reception
On Rotten Tomatoes, it holds a 52% approval rating based on 25 reviews. The website's consensus reads, "Weekend at Bernie's wrings a surprising amount of laughs out of its corpse-driven slapstick premise, but one joke can only carry a film so far." On Metacritic it has a score of 32 out of 100 based on reviews from 5 critics, indicating "generally unfavorable reviews". Audiences surveyed by CinemaScore gave the film a grade of "B" on scale of A+ to F.

Peter Travers of Rolling Stone called the film "tasteless" and "crude" and felt that in the end it was impossible to "drag one tired joke around for nearly two hours. Like Bernie, the movie ends up dead on its feet." Roger Ebert echoed this sentiment, arguing that movies centered on dead bodies are rarely funny. Ebert gave the film 1 out of 4 stars, stating "Weekend at Bernie's makes two mistakes: It gives us a joke that isn't very funny, and it expects the joke to carry an entire movie."

The film grossed US$30 million at the box office and was profitable on home video.

The film has remained popular in part because of repeated showings on cable television.  Entertainment Weekly described it as having "aged into something close to respectability".

Soundtrack
The film's closing credits feature the song "Hot and Cold", performed by American singer Jermaine Stewart. It was written by Andy Summers and Winston "Pipe" Matthews, and produced by Richard Rudolph and Michael Sembello. The song was released as a single by Arista in the United States during June 1989 to promote the film.

Lawsuit
On January 24, 2014, director Ted Kotcheff and screenwriter Robert Klane filed a lawsuit against Metro-Goldwyn-Mayer and 20th Century Fox for breach of contract for profits they claimed were due from the film.

See also
 The Two Deaths of Quincas Wateryell

References

External links
 
 
 
 
 

1989 films
1980s black comedy films
1980s buddy comedy films
1980s crime comedy films
20th Century Fox films
Metro-Goldwyn-Mayer films
American black comedy films
American buddy comedy films
American crime comedy films
1980s English-language films
Films about contract killing
Films directed by Ted Kotcheff
Films set in Long Island
Films set in New York City
Films set on beaches
Films shot in New York City
Films shot in North Carolina
Mafia comedy films
Necrophilia in film
Slapstick films
Cultural depictions of the Mafia
1989 comedy films
1980s American films